is a Japanese tokusatsu drama and the 32nd entry of Toei Company's Kamen Rider metaseries. It is the third series to debut during the Reiwa period and commemorates the 50th anniversary of the franchise. The series premiered on September 5, 2021, joining Kikai Sentai Zenkaiger and later, Avataro Sentai Donbrothers in the Super Hero Time line-up following the finale of Kamen Rider Saber and was followed by Kamen Rider Geats after its own finale.

Premise

In 1971, a military organization called NOAH led an expedition in Latin America and discovered the remains of the first devil Giff and an artifact from which they developed Vistamps. In the present, Giff's remains are in the possession of a NOAH splinter faction called Deadmans, a devil-worshiping cult who seeks to resurrect him by using Proto Vistamps to convert peoples' inner demons to their fold. Opposing Deadmans is an organization called Fenix, which has developed the Revice Driver for someone who has tamed their inner demon. Ikki Igarashi, who runs a sentō with his family, ends up acquiring the belt while forming a pact with his inner demon, Vice, to fight Deadmans together as Kamen Riders Revi and Vice.

Ikki's younger brother Daiji, a Fenix operative who was intended to become Revice but failed to out of fear, begins to avoid Ikki until he is possessed by his inner demon, Kagero, who obtains the means to transform into Kamen Rider Evil to defeat Ikki, who helps Daiji overcome Kagero's control and become Kamen Rider Live. Later, Ikki and Daiji's younger sister, Sakura, joins the fray after obtaining the means to become Kamen Rider Jeanne and awakening her inner demon, Lovekov, from the secret resistance group Weekend.

Episodes

Production
The Kamen Rider Revice trademark was registered by Toei on May 6, 2021.

On July 27, 2021, Kamen Rider Revice was officially announced during an online production announcement conference alongside its cast.

The opening theme song is performed by the vocal and dance group Da-ice collaborating with Subaru Kimura.

Kamen Rider Revi's main vehicle, a hoverbike that Kamen Rider Vice can transform into, is based on the real life XTurismo hoverbike developed by A.L.I. Technologies.

Initially, the original concept for Revice was that all of the past Kamen Rider series took place in their own TV series. However, due to Kamen Rider Revice guest starring in Kamen Rider Saber, the staff decided to create a new concept inspired by Kamen Rider Den-O and Kamen Rider Zi-O instead. Another concept considered for the series was a "post-COVID-19 pandemic road trip" story wherein Revi would explore a new era in the aftermath of the pandemic, with the idea of "moving forward" being a central theme. However, difficulties from the pandemic itself made it difficult to execute, resulting in it being changed to a family-themed drama, reflecting how lockdowns have allowed families staying together more opportunities to bond with each other.

Impact of the COVID-19 pandemic

Sakura Igarashi's actor, Ayaka Imoto, tested positive for COVID-19 on February 28, 2022 and recovered on March 7, 2022.

Controversy
Among the addressed problems are sexual harassment, unpaid overtime, and the chief producer overlooking her problems and not taking them seriously. Despite the hardships she endured, the assistant producer assured that Revices cast members are easy to work with and unrelated to her problems.

Films
Kamen Riders Revi and Vice made their debut in the crossover film Saber + Zenkaiger: Super Hero Senki and in a special film with the same title as the series double-billed with it. The events of the special film take place between episodes three and four of the series.

Beyond Generations
 is a crossover film released on December 17, 2021, starring the casts of Revice and Kamen Rider Saber. The film also features a new Kamen Rider from a possible future in the year 2071, 100 years after the debut of the first Kamen Rider television series, called Kamen Rider Century. Additionally, actors Akiyoshi Nakao and Arata Furuta portrayed Ryunosuke and Hideo Momose, while Maito Fujioka, the son of Hiroshi Fujioka, portrayed Takeshi Hongo's younger self. The film was written by Nobuhiro Mouri and directed by Takayuki Shibasaki. The theme song is "Promise" performed by Da-ice. The events of the film take place between episodes 13 and 14 of the series.

Battle Familia
 is a tie-in film released on July 22, 2022, double-billed with the film for Avataro Sentai Donbrothers. Actors Norito Yashima, Haruka Tateishi, Issei Mamehara, and Kane Kosugi portrayed Masato Sotoumi, Yume Takeda, Nozomu Ōtani, and Azuma respectively, and comedian Shingo Fujimori voiced Chic. Additionally, the main character of Kamen Rider Geats made his first appearance. The film was written by Hanta Kinoshita and directed by Koichi Sakamoto. The theme song is "Dance Dance" performed by Da-ice feat. Subaru Kimura. The events of the film take place between Birth of Chimera and episode 47 of the series.

Movie Battle Royale
 is a crossover film released on December 23, 2022, starring the casts of Revice and Kamen Rider Geats. Additionally, Takamasa Suga, Satoshi Matsuda, and Takashi Hagino reprised their respective roles as Shinji Kido, Ren Akiyama, and Takeshi Asakura from Kamen Rider Ryuki and appear as supporting cast members to commemorate their series' twentieth anniversary. The film was written by Yuya Takahashi and Hanta Kinoshita and directed by Takayuki Shibasaki. The theme song is "Change my future" performed by Koda Kumi.

Web-exclusive series
 is a five-episode web-exclusive series released on Telasa on January 30, 2022. Additionally, Minehiro Kinomoto of Kamen Rider W, Taira Imata of Kamen Rider Drive, Ryo Matsuda and Metal Yoshida of Kamen Rider Gaim, and Mitsuru Karahashi of Kamen Rider 555 reprised their respective roles of Ryu Terui, Genpachiro Otta, Hideyasu Jonouchi, Oren Pierre Alfonso, and Naoya Kaido. The theme song is "Without you" performed by Ikki Igarashi & Hiromi Kadota (Kentaro Maeda & Junya Komatsu). The events of the web-exclusive series take place between episodes 16 and 17 of the series.
 is a five-episode web-exclusive series released on Toei Tokusatsu Fan Club on March 27, 2022. The theme song is "My dream" performed by Yukimi Igarashi (Kurara Emi & Sakurako Okubo). The events of the web-exclusive series take place 25 years prior to the series.
 is a web-exclusive animated short series released on Toei Tokusatsu Fan Club on April 9, 2022.
Birth of Chimera is a web-exclusive series released on Toei Tokusatsu Fan Club on July 22, 2022. The events of the web-exclusive series take place between episode 44 of the series and Kamen Rider Revice the Movie: Battle Familia.
 is a three-episode web-exclusive series released on Toei Tokusatsu Fan Club on August 7, 2022. Additionally, Noa Tsurushima of Kamen Rider Zero-One, Mei Angela of Kamen Rider Saber, Hikaru Yamamoto of Kamen Rider W, Ruka Matsuda of Kamen Rider Ex-Aid, Yuko Takayama of Kamen Rider Wizard, Mio Kudo of Kamen Rider Ghost, Yukari Taki of Kamen Rider Build, and Shieri Ohata of Kamen Rider Zi-O reprised their respective roles of Is, Reika Shindai, Akiko Narumi, Poppy Pipopapo, Rinko Daimon, Kanon Fukami, Sawa Takigawa, and Tsukuyomi while Hiroe Igeta of Zero-One reprised her voice role of Kamen Rider Valkyrie. The theme song is "Riot in bloom" performed by Hana Natsuki (Hikari Kabashima).
 is an upcoming web-exclusive special scheduled for release on Toei Tokusatsu Fan Club in spring 2023. The events of the web-exclusive special take place after Revice Forward: Kamen Rider Live & Evil & Demons.

DVD and Blu-ray-exclusive series
 is Televi-Kuns .
Dear Gaga is included as part of the Blu-ray releases of Kamen Rider Revice. It is a two-episode side story focusing on Hiromi Kadota and takes place in between episodes 21 and 29 of the series.
 is Televi-Kuns "Hyper Battle DVD".

V-Cinema
 is a V-Cinema release scheduled for a limited theatrical release on February 10, 2023, followed by its DVD and Blu-ray release on May 10, 2023. The events of the V-Cinema take place after the end of the main series. The V-Cinema was written by Nobuhiro Mouri and directed by Koichi Sakamoto.

Manga and novel
 is a one-shot manga included in the Kamen Rider Revice Secret Book, a bonus booklet distributed to the first 400,000 attendees of Saber + Zenkaiger: Super Hero Senki on August 7, 2021. The manga is composed by producer Taku Mochizuki and illustrated by Mugi and Waima Hino, and tells the story of the Kamen Rider Revice film from Daiji Igarashi's point of view.
 is a short story in the booklet included in the Collector's Pack Deluxe Edition of the Blu-ray release of Kamen Rider: Beyond Generations.

Cast
: 
, Himself (30, 31, 50): 
, : 
: 
: 
: 
: 
: 
: 
: 
: 
, Herself (31): 
: 
, Demons Driver: 
: 
, : 
: 
: 
: 
: 
Revice, Live/Evil, Jeanne, Destream Equipment Voice, Vistamp Voice: 
Giffard Rex Vistamp (Side S) Voice: YOFFY
Juuga Equipment Voice, Himself (31):

Guest cast

: 
: 
: 
: 
Scammers (9, 10): , 
Scammer (9, 10, 50) 
: 
Chameleon Deadman's original human form (14, 16): 
: 
: 
Themselves (22, 23): 
Himself (30): 
Himself (30): 
Young Masumi Karizaki (42, 43, 48): 
: 
:

Theme songs
Opening theme
"liveDevil"
Lyrics: Shoko Fujibayashi
Composition: MUSOH, STEVEN LEE, SLIPKID, Sota Hanamura
Arrangement: STEVEN LEE
Add Arrangement: Hiroyuki Fujino
Artist: Da-ice feat. Subaru Kimura
Episodes 1, 18, 20, 42, 48, and 50 do not feature the show's opening sequence. This song is used as an insert song in episodes 1, 10, 18, 20, 42, 48, and 50.
Insert themes
"Go with the flo"
Lyrics: Shoko Fujibayashi
Composition: Kōtarō Nakagawa
Arrangement: tatsuso
Artist: Ikki, Daiji, & Sakura Igarashi (Kentaro Maeda, Wataru Hyuga, & Ayaka Imoto)
Episodes: 16
"VOLCANO"
Lyrics: Shoko Fujibayashi
Composition: tatsuso
Artist: Ikki Igarashi & Vice (Kentaro Maeda & Subaru Kimura)
Episodes: 17

Lyrics: Bintaro Cola
Composition: tatsuo
Artist: Vice (Subaru Kimura)
Episodes: 29
"My dream"
Lyrics: Shio Watanabe
Composition & Arrangement: Go Sakabe
Artist: Yukimi Igarashi (Kurara Emi)
Episodes: 42
"Mirage Mirror"
Lyrics: Shoko fujibayashi
Composition: Ryo
Artist: Daiji Igarashi & Kagero (Wataru Hyuga)
Episodes: 44
"Cherry-ish!"
Lyrics: Isa Takinoo
Composition: tatsuso
Artist: Sakura Igarashi & Lovekov (Ayaka Imoto & Miku Itō)
Episodes: 46

Lyrics: Shoko Fujibayashi
Composition: tatsuo
Artist: Ikki Igarashi (Kentaro Maeda)
Episodes: 50

Reception
In an online popularity poll for characters of Kamen Rider Revice, conducted by Japanese website NLab Media, Hiromi Kadota emerges as the first place victor with a total of 1845 votes out of 4528. His dedication as Kamen Rider Demons and the desire to move forward even after the loss of his leader and subordinates are cited by the voters as one of the good points behind his popularity.

Notes

References

External links
Official website at TV Asahi 
Official website at Kamen Rider Web 

Official website for Kamen Rider Revice the Movie: Battle Familia 
Official website for Kamen Rider Geats × Revice: Movie Battle Royal 
Official website for Revice Forward: Kamen Rider Live & Evil & Demons 

2021 Japanese television series debuts
2022 Japanese television series endings
Revice
TV Asahi original programming
Dark fantasy television series
Demons in television
2020s Western (genre) television series
Neo-Western television series